Pietro Griffo (Latin: Petrus Griffus) (died 1516) was an Italian Roman Catholic prelate who served as Bishop of Forlì (1512–1516).

Biography
On 31 Oct 1512, Pietro Griffo was appointed by Pope Julius II as Bishop of Forlì.
He served as Bishop of Forlì until his death in 1516.

References 

16th-century Italian Roman Catholic bishops
Bishops appointed by Pope Julius II
1516 deaths
Bishops of Forlì